Coolaroo is a suburb in Melbourne, Victoria, Australia,  north of Melbourne's Central Business District, located within the City of Hume local government area. Coolaroo recorded a population of 3,193 at the 2021 census.

History

Coolaroo is thought to be derived from an Aboriginal word meaning 'brown snake'. The area was acquired by the Housing Commission of Victoria in 1951 for housing estates, with construction not commencing until 1966. Until the late 1990s, Coolaroo's boundaries extended past the railway line and Pascoe Vale Road into the area that is now known as Meadow Heights.

Population

The next most common countries of birth were Iraq 9.2%, Turkey 5.5% and Lebanon 3.8%. 37.9% of people spoke only English at home. Other languages spoken at home included Arabic 14.4%, Turkish 11.8% and Assyrian Neo-Aramaic 8.1%, The most common responses for religion were Islam 28.8%, Catholic 23.2% and No Religion 14.4%.

Education
 Coolaroo South Primary School
 St. Mary's Coptic Orthodox College

Facilities

Most of the shopping centres near Coolaroo are located in neighbouring suburbs, including Meadow Heights, which has the Meadow Heights Shopping Centre and Dallas Shopping Centre (Dobell Place and Dargie Court), to the south.

Transport

Bus
Four bus routes service Coolaroo:

 : Craigieburn station – Broadmeadows station via Upfield station. Operated by Broadmeadows Bus Service.
 : Upfield station – Broadmeadows station via Coolaroo. Operated by Dysons.
 : Roxburgh Park station – Pascoe Vale station via Meadow Heights, Broadmeadows and Glenroy. Operated by Dysons.
 : Frankston station – Melbourne Airport (SmartBus service). Operated by Kinetic Melbourne.

Train
Coolaroo railway station is located on the Craigieburn line. It opened to passengers on Sunday 6 June 2010, almost 40 years after plans for a station first surfaced. Coolaroo is also served by Upfield station, which is the terminus for the Upfield line. The station is located on Barry Road, and the station and railway line acts as the suburb boundary between Coolaroo and Campbellfield.

In popular culture

The popular 1997 Australian film The Castle was set in Coolaroo, although the house featured was actually located in Strathmore.

See also
 City of Broadmeadows – Coolaroo was previously within this former local government area.

References

External links
Australian Places - Coolaroo

Suburbs of Melbourne
Suburbs of the City of Hume